Hoseynabad (also Romanized as Ḩoseynābād) is a village in Manzariyeh Rural District, in the Central District of Shahreza County, Isfahan Province, Iran. At the 2006 census, its population was 20, in 5 families.

References 

Populated places in Shahreza County